The 1965 Kangaroo Tour of New Zealand was a mid-season tour of New Zealand by the Australia national rugby league team. The Australians played eight matches on tour, including two tests against the New Zealand national rugby league team. The tour began on 9 June and finished on 28 June.

Leadership 
Ian Walsh was both the captain and the coach of the touring side. Walsh appeared in seven of the eight matches. Reg Gasnier captained the Australian team in the one match in which Walsh did not appear, against Canterbury. 
The team was co-managed by Arnold Stehr (Manly, NSW) and Des Green (Ipswich, Qld).

Touring squad 
The Rugby League News published details of the touring team including the players' ages and weights. A team photo was published at the conclusion of the tour. 
Match details - listing surnames of both teams and the point scorers - were included in E.E. Christensen's Official Rugby League Yearbook, as was a summary of the players' point-scoring. 
Cavanagh, Gleeson and Wellington were selected from Queensland clubs. Beath, Buman and Pannowitz were selected from clubs in New South Wales Country areas. The balance of the squad were playing for Sydney based clubs during the 1965 season.

Tour 
The Australians played eight matches on the tour, winning all of the matches except for the second test against New Zealand.

First test

Second test

References 

Australia national rugby league team tours
Rugby league tours of New Zealand
Kangaroo tour of New Zealand
Kangaroo tour of New Zealand